DXMK (97.5 FM), broadcasting as 97.5 Magik FM, is a radio station owned and operated by Century Broadcasting Network. The station's studio is located at the 5th floor, D&V Plaza Bldg., Jose C. Aquino Ave., Butuan.

References

Radio stations in Butuan
Radio stations established in 1984